Eliane Glaser is an English writer, lecturer, radio producer and broadcaster.

Early life and media career

Glaser was educated at St Edmund Hall, Oxford, graduating from Oxford University with a First Class degree in English literature in 1995, before gaining her PhD in early modern literature in 2000 at Birkbeck, University of London.

Glaser has written for the Independent, New Statesman, and the London Review of Books, and is a contributor to The Guardian, where she has written articles on contemporary propaganda, fake authenticity, Astroturf politics, cyber-utopianism, and the ideology of natural childbirth. Glaser is a regular contributor to, producer of, and sometime presenter for BBC Radio 3 and Radio 4: Glaser has appeared on BBC Radio 3's Free Thinking to discuss conspiracy, ideology and bureaucracy, and wrote and presented an edition of BBC Radio 4's Four Thought in defence of authority.

Academic work
Glaser's work often focuses on contemporary culture and politics, and "exposes other people's polemical strategies, particularly when they are concealed or disavowed; presented as self-evident fact." Glaser has written reports and articles for the New Economics Foundation and the Institute for Public Policy Research. She has served on the management committee of the Compass think tank. She was a Reader in creative writing at Bath Spa University and an associate research fellow at Birkbeck, University of London. In 2017 Glaser was a visiting fellow of St. Catherine's College, Oxford University. From 2020, Glaser is a Research Fellow at the School of Advanced Study, University of London.

Books

References

External links
 elianeglaser.org

Living people
21st-century English women writers
Alumni of St Edmund Hall, Oxford
Alumni of Birkbeck, University of London
BBC Radio 3 presenters
BBC Radio 4 presenters
The Guardian journalists
Lecturers
Year of birth missing (living people)